Plexippus clemens is a species of jumping spiders that lives in Egypt, India, Iran, Israel, Libya, Turkey and Yemen. Originally placed in the genus Salticus by Octavius Pickard-Cambridge in 1872, the species was transferred into the genus Euophrys by Eugène Simon in 1876, into Menemerus by Jerzy Prószyński in 1984 and eventually into Plexippus by Prószyński in 2003.

Synonyms
Synonyms for the species include:
Plexippus bhutani Zabka, 1990
Plexippus similis Wesołowska & van Harten, 1994
Plexippus tectonicus Prószyński, 2003
Plexippus yinae Peng & Li, 2003

References

Salticidae
Spiders of Africa
Spiders described in 1872
Fauna of Egypt
Spiders of the Indian subcontinent
Fauna of Iran
Fauna of Libya
Arthropods of Turkey
Spiders of the Arabian Peninsula